Fall Brawl '97: War Games was the fifth Fall Brawl professional wrestling pay-per-view (PPV) event produced by World Championship Wrestling (WCW). It  took place on September 14, 1997 from the Lawrence Joel Veterans Memorial Coliseum in Winston-Salem, North Carolina. As of 2014 the event is available on the WWE Network.

Production

Background
The WarGames match was created when Dusty Rhodes was inspired by a viewing of Mad Max Beyond Thunderdome. It was originally used as a specialty match for the Four Horsemen. The first WarGames match took place at The Omni in Atlanta during the NWA's Great American Bash '87 tour, where it was known as War Games: The Match Beyond. It became a traditional Fall Brawl event from 1993 to 1998.

Storylines
The event featured professional wrestling matches that involve different wrestlers from pre-existing scripted feuds and storylines. Professional wrestlers portray villains, heroes, or less distinguishable characters in the scripted events that build tension and culminate in a wrestling match or series of matches.

Event

During the WarGames Match, Curt Hennig entered the match for the Horsemen last due to an apparent shoulder injury. Moments later Hennig revealed his injury to be a ruse and that he was on the nWo's side all along. The New World Order then handcuffed Chris Benoit and Steve McMichael to the cage and began assaulting Ric Flair. Kevin Nash took the microphone and repeatedly asked the helpless Horsemen if they wanted to give up, but McMichael refused and Benoit repeatedly spat in Nash's face. The Horsemen finally surrendered after Nash threatened to slam Flair's head into the cage structure with the door. McMichael, not wanting to see Flair beat up any worse than he already was, made the call for his team. After the surrender, Hennig slammed the door onto Flair's head anyways.

A Steve McMichael vs. Konnan match had been advertised on WCW.com and in the event program, though never on television. Both participated in the War Games main event, but a singles match between the two did not take place.

Results

References

Professional wrestling in North Carolina
Events in North Carolina
1997 in North Carolina
Fall Brawl
September 1997 events in the United States
1997 World Championship Wrestling pay-per-view events